Waise Lee Chi-hung (born 19 December 1959) is a Hong Kong film and television actor best known for playing the roles of villains and antagonists in various films.

Biography
Lee graduated from TVB's Artist Training Academy in 1982 and was from the same batch as Tony Leung Chiu-Wai and Francis Ng. He started acting in Hong Kong films in the 1980s and became famous for his role as the antagonist Tam Shing in John Woo's 1986 film A Better Tomorrow. Since then Lee has made appearances in several films, including A Chinese Ghost Story II (1990), To Be Number One (1991), Powerful Four (1992). He also played the leading roles in The Big Heat (1988), Bullet in the Head (1990) and The Cat.

Lee is best known on television for his roles in television series produced by TVB, such as Mind Our Own Business (1993), Cold Blood Warm Heart (1996), Burning Flame (1998) and A Step into the Past (2001). Starting around 2001, Lee made less appearances in TVB's television dramas. That year, he starred in To Where He Belongs, a television series produced by TVB's rival ATV. He has also been more active in working on mainland Chinese television series since the late 2000s.

Personal life
Lee was first married to a fellow Hong Kong actress Angela Fong Hiu-hung, after which they moved to Toronto, Canada where they have a son Jasper in 1994. Lee and Fong had since divorced. In 2010 Lee married a mainland Chinese actress Wang Yaqi (王雅琦), who is of Hui descent. Their son, Kyle, was born in June 2018.

Filmography

References

External links

 Waise Lee at chinesemov.com

1959 births
Living people
TVB actors
Hong Kong male television actors
Hong Kong male film actors
20th-century Hong Kong male actors
21st-century Hong Kong male actors